MTV is a Latin American pay television network that was launched on 1 October 1993 as the Hispanic American version of MTV. It is owned by Paramount Networks Americas, a subsidiary of Paramount Global.

The channel broadcasts music videos as well as reality shows, TV series and movies, which may be directly or indirectly related to music, aimed at the youth. Its schedule is focused on certain musical genres, mainly pop, rock mix, reggaeton (since 2005), hip hop, trap, electronic music, and K-pop (since 2018). Each of these categories includes music in English, Spanish and Korean.

MTV Latin America is headquartered in Miami Beach and has two feeds covering the region, centered in Mexico City, Mexico and Buenos Aires, Argentina.

The channel has also produced its own versions of MTV reality shows like Room Raiders or Dismissed, but most of the time curse words are not censored in Latin American countries (specially during the watershed time). The first video broadcast by the network was We are sudamerican rockers by Chilean band Los Prisioneros.

History

A few important events in the late 1980s led to the creation of MTV Latin America. Firstly, the program "MTV International" was created in 1988 and led by Daisy Fuentes. This weekly program was broadcast through Latin American and American channels and presented music videos from both regions. A second catalyst was the rise of the "Spanish Rock fever", which included artists such as Argentine rockers Miguel Mateos and Soda Stereo. Lastly, during these years the first-ever Spanish rock concert in the US was put on by Miguel Mateos, which created excitement amongst Latino communities in the United States.

With the growing popularity of Latino artists, channel executives began to take notice and realized the increasing quality and popularity of music sung in Spanish. After considering the success of other international MTV channels, such as MTV Europe and MTV Brasil, MTV Networks launched "MTV in Spanish" in October 1993. The channel had one signal to broadcast to all of Latin America. All programs were recorded and produced in Miami, FL where the studios were located. Daisy Fuentes became one of the first VJs for the channel.

Beto González from Guatemala was in charge of MTV media and ads from 1994 from 1999, later succeeded by Gus Rodríguez from México.

As the channel began to experience growing popularity in the early part of 1995, new shows were added to the program. For the first time, shows unrelated to music were broadcast, such as Beavis and Butthead. MTV News was added, a segment dedicated to news on celebrities, film, politics and social issues, usually combining subjective and objective commentary. Lastly, in this same year the show Connection was launched, the most popular show in the channel's history, which has remained on air for a record length of time and boasts the largest audience of any program in the history of the channel.

Given the channel's social and economic growth, in April 1996 "MTV in Spanish" was divided into two regional signals, "North", covering Mexico, Central America, Colombia and Venezuela, and "South", covering Argentina and the rest of the region. This division was created in order to cater programming more closely to distinct audiences. As a result, in 1996 MTV became the number one music channel in Latin America. The channel also became one of the first US television brands to develop a website for Latin America audiences with the launch MTVLA.com in partnership with the Miami-based company Internet Marketing Consultants.

However, during 1999 the channel began experiencing problems. The musical aspect of "MTV in Spanish" was disorganized and the channel was having trouble catering to distinct regional tastes. Executives decided to segment audiences by dividing the channel into two signals: "MTV Mexico" and "MTV Argentina", with studios and regional offices located in capital cities of each country.

During this time, the channel began to show American MTV programs subtitled in Spanish. As well, in the year 2000, MTV created a new signal directed towards Chile, known as "MTV Southwest", which repeated programming from MTV Mexico but adjusted to Chilean time. While at first MTV thought about repeating MTV Argentina’s programming for the Chilean signal because of the proximity of the countries, it was decided that considering cultural traits and the difference in accents between Chilean and Argentine Spanish, it would be more suitable to adapt Mexican programming for the Chilean signal. However, late 2002, MTV Southwest was cancelled due to the low number of viewers changing to "MTV Central" following in Chile. In 2004, it closed "MTV Central" due to the launch of VH1 Latin America. In 2005, it returned "MTV Central" directed towards Colombia.

Since 2009, MTV has started to lose hours of music videos in the programming being replaced by more reality shows, this change is still in "MTV North". In february 2018, "MTV South" it bases most of its programming on music videos, up to 18 hours daily, leaving reality shows that are broadcast on the other feed only airing on primetime. In 2021, it closed "MTV Central" due to the arrival of Paramount+. Currently, two signals operate in Latin America: "MTV North", covering Mexico, Colombia, Peru, Ecuador, Bolivia and Central American and Caribbean countries, and "MTV South", covering Argentina, Chile, Venezuela, Paraguay and Uruguay.

Programming

On Air Music Shows
 120 Minutos (South/DirecTV Feed)
 Insomnio MTV
 Cuchareando en MTV
 Arriba MTV
 Playlist (North Feed)
 Playlist: Perreo Hasta el Piso (North Feed)
 Playlist: MTV Classics (North Feed)
 Latino Fuerte (South/DirecTV Feed)
 MTV ATR: A Todo Ritmo (South/DirecTV Feed)
 MTV Especiales (South/DirecTV Feed)
 Tus 20 (South/DirecTV Feed)
 Tu Mix de Hoy (South/DirecTV Feed)
 La Evolucion (South/DirecTV Feed)
 Antes y Despues (South/DirecTV Feed)
 MTV 40 Imprescindibles (South/DirecTV Feed)
 MTV World Stage
 MTV News

On Air Series 
 Acapulco Shore
 Amazingness
 Are You The One?
 Are You The One? El Match Perfecto (Latin American Version)
 Are You The One? Brasil 
 Catfish: The TV Show
 Catfish México
 Clickbait with Daniel Bautista (North Feed)
 Clickbait with Lucas Garofalo (South/DirecTV Feed)
 Ex On The Beach
 Ex On The Beach: Body SOS
 Ex On The Beach: Brasil
 Geordie Shore
 Jersey Shore: Family Vacation
 Just Tattoo of Us
 La Familia del Barrio
 MTV Acaplay
 MTV Cannigia Libre
 Ridiculousness
 Teen Mom OG
 The Challenge: Vendettas
 The Charlotte Show
 Siesta Key
 Super Shore
 Vidiots

Special Events
 MTV VMA (Video Music Awards)
 MTV EMA (Europe Music Awards)
 MTV MIAW (Millennial Awards)
 MTV Movie & TV Awards
 MTV Unplugged

Feeds
MTV Latin America is divided in the following feeds:

North Feed (centered in Mexico City): Mexico, Colombia, Bolivia, Costa Rica, Dominican Republic, Ecuador, El Salvador, Guatemala, Honduras, Nicaragua, Panama and Peru.
South Feed (centered in Buenos Aires): Argentina, Chile, Paraguay, Uruguay and Venezuela.

Social issues and MTV
In addition to broadcasting core MTV programs, MTV Latin America has also produced other non-music-related programs that address social and cultural issues that impact Latin American youth. These programs address issues such as politics, sexually transmitted infections, the environment and sexuality. Some of these shows include:

 Speak out: We are 30 million – Mexican Elections of 2006 (a series promoting the participation of youth in the Presidential elections, and included interviews with each of the candidates)
 Xpress (an award-winning documentary on the killing of women in Juarez City, Chihuahua, Mexico)
 Staying Alive (a co-production with CNN covering the worldwide HIV/AIDS epidemic)

Other projects
In 2002, MTV Networks announced the first Latin American MTV Video Music Awards.  For the first three years, the awards were held in Miami. In 2006 and 2007 they were held in Mexico City. In 2008, the Awards were moved to Guadalajara, Mexico. In 2009, the show took place in various cities, including Bogotá, Buenos Aires, Mexico City and Los Angeles. In 2013, was replaced by MTV Millennial Awards.

Audience demographics
The majority of viewers are between the ages of 14 and 34. The average age of viewers is 18 years, with the majority of the audience being older. About 76% of viewers belong to the middle to upper class. As well, the channel notes a large number of viewers are university students. Moreover, according to a study conducted by TGI Latina in 2004, MTV Latin America’s audience is 57% male and 43% female.

Public reception
MTV Latin America, like other MTV channels around the world, has been one of the first television channels to receive criticisms, largely from their own viewers. While many criticisms apply to MTV as a whole, some criticisms apply specifically to MTV Latin America. One reason for these criticisms is that certain videos and reality shows on MTV Latin America are not censored.

One of the main criticisms against MTV Latin America is that it is merely a commercial channel, whose broadcasting of videos is based on only economic interests and not on audience requests. MTV has been accused of being excessively commercial and an advertising tool for major music corporations. MTV has undermined the importance of the music itself, replacing it with merely a visual esthetic. This creates a negative public image for MTV.

As well, MTV has recently been criticized for broadcasting too many reality shows, distancing itself from its original purpose, which was to broadcast musical programming. MTV has argued that these shows include music from current artists in their soundtrack, such as Laguna Beach. This show in particular has caused great controversy among viewers as it offers content completely unrelated to music.

Another criticism against MTV is that the channel spreads and promotes inappropriate behaviour among youth, in both music videos and shows. Some controversial content include sex, early pregnancy, general violence, use of drugs, daily drinking and smoking habits of celebrities and domestic violence.

A final criticism, exclusive to MTV Latin America, relates to the form in which titles are presented on the screen, which usually includes a variety of orthographical errors such as missing accents and use of exclamation and question marks. Critics argue that these errors do not aid in didactic learning for viewers, the majority of which are youth.

However, MTV Latin America has also made many positive achievements. Between 2005 and 2006, MTV broadcast a campaign entitled “Don’t Kill the Music”, which aimed to broadcast a message of awareness to youth about music in general. As well the channel has created various projects to help independent Hispanic bands and musical artists.

Controversy

Subliminal message bumper

On August 2002, there was a strong controversy over a 50-seconds bumper in the middle of an commercial break on the channel; The curtain showed a man with the Buddha position, 40 seconds later, some photos of pornographic content appear second by second (where some women are tied, gagged and naked). The bumper was so controversial, to such a degree that in the Brazilian version it was censored for having strong content and there were lawsuits. The bumper went off the air in March 2003 due to a programming change, it was not until nine years later at early morning on September 7, 2012 that curtain appeared again on the same channel due to unknown reasons. The last time since they have records of the bumper was on October 17, 2020 without giving an explanation.

See also
 List of MTV Latin America VJs

References

MTV channels
Television channels and stations established in 1993
Spanish-language television stations
Television channel articles with incorrect naming style